The Subbotin oil field (Russian: месторождение Субботина) is an oil and gas field located on the continental shelf of the Black Sea near Crimea. It was discovered in 1978 by seismic exploration, and evaluated after deep drilling in 2005–2011. The field is being developed by the Crimean company Chornomornaftogaz.

References

Black Sea energy
Oil fields of Russia